Adams Olabode Michael professionally known as Smada is a Nigerian singer, and songwriter signed to NATIVE Records, in partnership with Def Jam Recordings. He came into the music scene with an acclaimed extended play NÜNIVERSE, with lead track "Family", and is widely known for his breakthrough single "Ye Anthem", released in 2022 as his first single with NATIVE Records.

Early life
Adams Olabode Michael was born and raised in Lagos, where he also had his tertiary education from the University of Lagos. Olabode is the last child of five, and began playing the drum as a child. He was asked to try out singing by his elder brother.

Career
In 2021, while in school he released his second extended play NÜNIVERSE, which reached number 1 on iTunes Nigeria, and also swam the minor hit track "Family" from the EP, which peaked on Apple Music Nigeria Top 100 songs. He achieved airplay with the song after it was co-signed by Don Jazzy. In 2022, Smada gained popularity within the Gen Z communities on TikTok, when he began uploading videos with snippets of his unreleased songs, including "Ye Anthem", which became his most-anticipated single from TikTok.

On 29 November 2022, NATIVE Records signed Smada in partnership with Def Jam Recordings. On 2 December 2022, NATIVE Records releases the official music video for "Ye Anthem", featuring King Perryy and Toyé. On 5 December 2022, "Ye Anthem" debuted at number 10 on the Nigeria TurnTable Top Alternative/Dancehall Songs chart. On 10 December 2022, the song lead Pulse Nigeria Future Sounds playlist. In 2023, he was cited as one of the 18 Nigerian Artists To Watch by The Culture Custodian.

Discography

Singles

References 

Living people
English-language singers from Nigeria
Nigerian pop singers
Nigerian alté singers
21st-century Nigerian male singers
Year of birth missing (living people)